Aziz Ahmed (born 1 January 1961) is a retired Bangladeshi four star general who was  Chief of Army Staff (CAS) of the Bangladesh Army, from 25 June 2018 to 24 June 2021. He was succeeded by General SM Shafiuddin Ahmed on 24 June 2021.

Early life and education 
Ahmed was born on 1 January 1961 in Narayangonj. His ancestral home is in the village of Tarki in Sultanabad Union, Matlab Uttar Upazila, Chandpur District. His father Abdul Wadud worked as an NCO in the air force and his mother's name is Renuja Begum. He completed his SSC from Mohammadpur Government High School in 1977, went to Notre Dame College, Dhaka and completed HSC there; he also joined the engineering course in Textile Technology from College of Textile Technology (which is presently known as Bangladesh University of Textiles) in 1980.

Army life 
Aziz joined the Bangladesh Military Academy in 1980, and was commissioned in the regiment of artillery on 10 June 1983 with 8th BMA Long Course. He is a graduate of Defence Services Command and Staff College (Bangladesh). He completed his master's degree in defense studies, and MSc (Technical) from National University and also completed a Masters in Business Administration (Executive) from American International University-Bangladesh (AIUB). Aziz Ahmed has earned a PhD degree on "Border Management Challenges of Border Guard Bangladesh (BGB): Issues in Transnational Threat". The PhD degree was approved at the academic council and syndicate meeting of Bangladesh University of Professionals (BUP).

On 10 June 1983, Aziz Ahmed received his commission in the Regiment of Artillery from the Bangladesh Military Academy. He had been an Infantry Platoon Leader (1983-1984), Gun Position Officer (1984-1986), GSO-3 (Operation) in 69 Infantry Brigade, CHT (1986-1988), Battery Captain (1988-1990), attended the Junior Command Course in Army War College, Mhow (1989-1990), brigade major in an infantry brigade (1990-1991), Artillery Battery Commander (1991-1993), GSO-II in AHQ Military Training Directorate and GSO-I of AHQ Pay Pension & Allowance Directorate. Ahmed commanded one Artillery Regiment (1998-2000), one BDR (Bangladesh Rifles) Battalion (2000-2001), one BDR Sector (2001), two Artillery brigades including an Independent Air Defense Artillery Brigade (2008-2010). He also served as instructor for more than seven years (2001-2008) at the Artillery Center & School and the School of Military Intelligence.

As a Major General, Ahmed commanded the 33rd Infantry Division in Comilla from 2010 to 2012. He was appointed as Director General of Border Guard Bangladesh (BGB) on 5 December 2012. Under his command the BGB raised four regional headquarters, 15 battalions and established 108 new border outposts covering  unguarded border with India and Myanmar along the border in Chittagong Hill Tracts area, two floating outposts in the Sundarbans.

During his tenure a total of 18,000 new soldiers were recruited, including the first 100 female recruits in the BGB.

Ahmed also served as an observer for the United Nations Iraq-Kuwait Observation Mission (UNIKOM) and a military adviser to the force commander of the United Nations Mission in Sudan (UNMIS).

On 16 November 2016 he was promoted to lieutenant general and appointed as GOC of ARTDOC.

On 9 January 2018, he was appointed as Quarter Master General (QMG) of Bangladesh Army at Army Headquarters.

On 25 June 2018 Ahmed was promoted to the rank of General and was appointed to replace Gen. Abu Belal Muhammad Shafiul Huq as Chief of Army Staff of the Bangladesh Army. He retired from Bangladesh Army on 24 June 2021.

Contributions 

After the appointment of Ahmed, the Bangladesh Army witnessed important reforms. During his tenure, the Bangladesh Army has participated in 54 UN peace-keeping missions in 40 countries. He also facilitated the signing of a non-binding agreement with the Kingdom of Saudi Arabia for military cooperation and support that includes the deployment of Bangladeshi troops in Saudi Arabia. Ahmed played a vital role in normalizing the then BDR force after the Bangladesh Rifles revolt. He reinstated confidence on the newly formed BGB. Ahmed took initiative to launch 'Shimanto Bank'- a welfare project for the betterment of Border Guards of Bangladesh.

Personal life 
Ahmed is married to Begum Dilshad Nahar Aziz  and the couple has three sons.

Ahmed had 5 brothers including younger brother Tofail Ahmed Joseph, a convicted criminal.  In 2017, media reported that Joseph had spent 20 months in hospital, allegedly without any medical reason, and in privileged conditions. He was transported back to the jail from hospital when the issue was raised. He was given a presidential pardon on 30 May 2018, in order to undergo medical treatment in India. Two other brothers, Harris (or Haris) and Anis Ahmed, were also named as accomplices in the murder of Mostafa, and a fourth sibling, Sayeed Ahmed Tipu, was shot dead by assailants in the 1990s.

Controversies 
On 1 February 2021, Al Jazeera broadcast a one-hour long investigative documentary by David Bergman, son-in-law of prominent Bangladeshi Politician Kamal Ahmed, titled All the Prime Minister's Men, which revealed how Ahmed protected his brothers, Haris and Anis Ahmed, after they fled abroad to escape law enforcement despite them both being currently wanted by Bangladeshi law enforcement. In addition, leaked documents obtained by Al Jazeera revealed how General Aziz used officers to help Harris create a false identity, which was then used to set up businesses in Europe and buy properties around the world.

In other video recordings, Aziz's brother Haris boasts of profits he made from military contracts using his brother's power as army chief to extract bribes. The documentary also provided photographic evidence that in March 2019, Harris and Anis visited Dhaka for the wedding of Aziz's son, where the two fugitives partied alongside Bangladesh President Abdul Hamid and foreign dignitaries during an opulent ceremony.

The documentary has been publicly denounced by the Bangladesh government, and the Foreign Ministry of Bangladesh has hinted at taking legal steps against Al Jazeera on this accord. Bangladesh Army Headquarters condemned Al Jazeera report and told it was false, abusive, politically motivated to disrupt the harmony among different government organs of the country. UN Secretary-General's spokesman comments on the report in response to a question and said, it should be investigated by the relevant authorities.

In an audio recording broadcast by Qatar-based Al Jazeera television network, General Aziz Ahmed admitted to gain financially for being Chief of Army Staff, and wants to use that money to travel overseas and enjoy lavish life.

General Aziz Ahmed has offered the military's contract and better position for police forces in return for monetary gains from the lucrative contract.

The Guardian newspaper reported that General Aziz Ahmed instigated voter suppression in the 2014 general election in Bangladesh. Prime Minister Sheikh Hasina has maintained a peculiar relationship with General Aziz Ahmed. Prime Minister Shiekh Hasina's party won the election landslide due to Border Guard deployment in the countries, and the use of the Border Guard to torture and discourage opposition voters from entering the polling stations. In return, in 2018, Prime Minister Shiekh Hasina has promoted General Aziz Ahmed as the Chief of Army Staff.

Human Rights Watch United Nations reported a long pattern of extrajudicial killings, disappearances, and torture by the Bangladesh Army under General Aziz's control. New information suggests the Bangladesh military is in the government's abusive surveillance tactics at home by an Israeli-made surveillance system procured under the command of General Aziz Ahmed.

References

Living people
1961 births
Bangladesh Army generals
Director Generals of Border Guards Bangladesh
Chiefs of Army Staff, Bangladesh
Notre Dame College, Dhaka alumni
American International University-Bangladesh alumni
People from Matlab Uttar Upazila
Bangladesh University of Textiles alumni
Army War College, Mhow alumni